The 1985 British Grand Prix (formally the XXXVIII Marlboro British Grand Prix) was a Formula One motor race held at Silverstone on 21 July 1985. It was the eighth race of the 1985 Formula One World Championship.

The 65-lap race was won by Alain Prost, driving a McLaren-TAG, after he started from third position. Michele Alboreto finished second in a Ferrari, with Jacques Laffite third in a Ligier-Renault. The win, Prost's third of the season, moved him to within two points of Alboreto at the top of the Drivers' Championship.

Report 

Silverstone, a circuit located on a former World War II airfield located between London and Birmingham in England was known for being the fastest circuit used by Formula One; it was even faster than Monza and the Österreichring. The circuit's layout back then was quite different and simpler compared to the current layout used from 2010 onwards. Silverstone alternated the British Grand Prix with Brands Hatch and each circuit would host it every 2nd year.

Qualifying saw Keke Rosberg underline Silverstone's incredibly high speed laps by taking pole in his Williams with a lap of 1:05.591. At an average speed of 160.9 mph (259 km/h), it stood as the fastest qualifying lap in F1 history for 17 years. Alongside Rosberg on the front row was Nelson Piquet in the Brabham, while Alain Prost in the McLaren and Ayrton Senna in the Lotus were on the second row. Nigel Mansell in the second Williams and championship leader Michele Alboreto in the Ferrari filled the third row, while on the fourth were Andrea de Cesaris in the Ligier and Elio de Angelis in the second Lotus. Teo Fabi in the Toleman and Niki Lauda in the second McLaren completed the top ten.

At the start of the race, Senna made a superb start and passed Prost, the slow-starting Piquet and Rosberg to take the lead, while Mansell moved up to third and de Cesaris to fifth. Behind them, four cars were eliminated at the first corner, Copse, as Patrick Tambay in the Renault lost control and was hit by the second Ferrari of Stefan Johansson, which also caused the Osella of Piercarlo Ghinzani and the RAM of Philippe Alliot to crash into each other.

Back at the front, de Cesaris passed Prost and then Mansell to be third, before Prost repassed the Ligier on lap 9. Prost later admitted he was apprehensive about being behind the Ligier thanks to the unpredictable de Cesaris' reputation for crashing. Mansell dropped out on lap 18 with a clutch failure, before team-mate Rosberg suffered a broken exhaust four laps later. Senna continued to lead, with Prost now second and Lauda up to third ahead of de Cesaris, Piquet and Alboreto. Prost and Lauda's McLaren-TAG/Porsche MP4/2B's performance through high-speed corners was far superior to that of any other car competing that year – something that was a feature of all of the original Silverstone's 8 corners (10 if the 3-turn sequence of the Woodcote chicane is counted).

Alboreto passed Piquet for fifth, before moving up to fourth on lap 42 when de Cesaris's clutch failed. By then, Senna and Prost were running nose-to-tail. The Frenchman finally passed the Brazilian on lap 58, Lauda's electrics failing on the same lap. Then Senna's fuel injection failed, promoting Alboreto to second, while Jacques Laffite in the second Ligier moved up to third ahead of Piquet.

The chequered flag was erroneously shown at the end of lap 65, one lap early, with Prost having lapped the entire field. Halfway around what was meant to have been the final lap, Laffite ran out of fuel, which annoyed Piquet – he would have thus taken the final podium place had the error not been made. The final points were taken by Derek Warwick in the second Renault and Marc Surer in the second Brabham.

In the Drivers' Championship, Prost moved to within two points of Alboreto, while in the Constructors' Championship McLaren moved up to second, 18 points behind Ferrari.

Classification

Qualifying

Race

Championship standings after the race

Drivers' Championship standings

Constructors' Championship standings

References

British Grand Prix
British Grand Prix
Grand Prix
British Grand Prix